A cuddle party (or a cuddle puddle or snuggle party) is an event designed with the intention of allowing people to experience nonsexual group physical intimacy through cuddling.

History 

Reid Mihalko and Marcia Baczynski, a pair of self-described "relationship coaches" in New York City, founded Cuddle Party in New York on February 29, 2004.  According to their website, the events were initially created for friends who were too intimidated to attend Mihalko's informal massage workshops.  Upon publication of the Cuddle Party website, the events were opened to the general public, and, thanks to a swarm of media attention, became a phenomenon in New York.

In order to meet the demand for Cuddle Parties in other cities, Mihalko and Baczynski began a training and certification program in January 2005, and have since trained a number of individuals to facilitate Cuddle Parties in various cities.

Media 

 A cuddle party was featured on an episode of CSI: New York titled "Grand Murder at Central Station".
 The second season of the popular TV series An Idiot Abroad featured a cuddle party in the episode "Route 66".

See also 

 Physical intimacy
 Somatosensory system

References 

interpersonal relationships
parties